Torreilles is a commune in the Pyrénées-Orientales department in southern France.

Geography 
Torreilles is located in the canton of La Côte Salanquaise and in the arrondissement of Perpignan.

Population

Sites of interest 
 The pre-Romanesque Saint-Julien-et-Sainte-Basilisse church.

See also
Communes of the Pyrénées-Orientales department

References

Communes of Pyrénées-Orientales